N. Govindan Kutty was a Malayalam film actor. He has appeared in around 100 films, acting mainly in villain roles.

Background
Kutty was born at Fort Kochi in 1924, Ernakulam as the son of Sankara Narayanan and Nanukutty Amma. He was a natural actor and was prominent as a villain during the time when Prem Nazir and Jayan were heroes. He had written several professional dramas and screenplays for Malayalam films. He died in 1993.

Filmography

As an actor

 Saakshaal Sreemaan Chaathunni (1993)
 Ithile Iniyum Varu (1986) as Chief editor Menon
 Thacholi Thankappan (1984) as Chandu
 Padayottam (1982)
 Ariyappedatha Rahasyam (1981) as Gopi
 Sanchari (1981) as Vasu
 Naayaattu (1980)
 Idimuzhakkam (1980) as Varkey
 Swathu (1980)
 Paalaattu Kunjikkannan (1980)
 Mamaankam (1979)
 Aavesham
 Ponnil Kulicha Raathri (1979)
 Avar Jeevikkunnu (1978)
 Njaan Njaan Maathram (1978)
 Kadathanaattu Maakkam (1978)
 Jagadguru Aadisankaran (1977)
 Agninakshathram (1977)
 Sreemad Bhagavadgeetha (1977)
 Vanadevatha (1976) as Thankappan
 Agnipushpam (1976)
 Prasadam (1976) as Keshavan
 Panchami (1976) as Moochaari
 Tourist Bungalow (1975)
 Neelapponmaan (1975)
 Omanakkunju (1975)
 Chattambikkalyaani (1975)
 Penpada (1975)
 Madhurappathinezhu (1975)
 Ankathattu (1974)
 Kanyakumari (1974) .... Veerappan
 Durga (1974)
 Naathoon (1974)
 Thumbolaarcha (1974)
Thacholi Marumakan Chandu (1974) as Kunjikelu
 Arakkallan Mukkaalkkallan (1974)
 Chanchala (1974)
 Urvashi Bharathi (1973)
 Pavangal Pennungal (1973)
 Ponnapuram Kotta (1973)
Thaniniram (1973) as Aadu Veladuyhan
 Chuzhi (1973) as Varghese
 Police Ariyaruthu (1973) as Thomas Augustine
 Pacha Nottukal (1973) as Anthappan
 Padmavyooham (1973) as Philip
 Panitheeratha Veedu  (1973) as Thankayyan
 Kaapalika (1973) as A.G.Nambiar
 Ajnaathavasam (1973) as K. S. Pilla
 Driksakshi (1973) as Inspector Radhakrishnan
 Maravil Thirivu Sookshikkuka (1972) as Thampi
 Aadyathe Kadha (1972) as Inquilab Pankan
 Preethi (1972)
 Akkarappacha (1972)
 Postmane Kananilla (1972) as Vallabha Panikkar
 Ananthashayanam (1972)
 Sambhavami Yuge Yuge (1972) as Swami
 Lakshyam (1972)
 Lanka Dahanam (1971)
 Sarasayya (1971) as Mohan
 Anubhavangal Paalichakal (1971)
 Shiksha (1971) as Prathapan
 Panchavan Kaadu (1971)
 Ernakulam Junction (1971)
 Vithukal (1971) as Raghavan
 Vimochanasamaram (1971)
 Marunaattil Oru Malayaali (1971) as Govindan
 Raathrivandi (1971) as Robert
 Kalithozhi (1971)
 Ara Nazhika Neram (1970) as Peelippochan
 Bheekara Nimishangal (1970) as Ugran Velu
 Cross Belt (1970)
 Pearl View (1970) as Bastain
 Othenante Makan (1970) as Vadakkumpattu Karanavar
 Nizhalaattam (1970) as Paul
 Vazhve Mayam (1970) as Ramachandran Nair
 Lottery Ticket (1970) as Madhavankutty
 Kadalppaalam (1969) as Karthavu
 Adimakal (1969) as Pachu Kurup
 Susie (1969)
 Kannoor Deluxe (1969) as K B S Nair
 Kaattukurangu (1969)
 Jwala (1969) as Govinda Pilla
 Rahasyam (1969) as Govindankutty
 Danger Biscuit (1969) as Mathew
 Love In Kerala (1968) as R.K.Raja
 Dial 2244 (1968)
 Thulaabharam (1968)
 Yakshi (1968) as Chandran
 Kodungallooramma (1968)
 Ezhu Raathrikal (1968) as Govindan
 Thirichadi (1968)
 Punnapra Vayalar (1968) as Achuthan 
 Mainatharuvi Kolakkes (1967)
 Karutha Rathrikal (1967)
 Mulkkireedam (1967)
 Naadan Pennu (1967)
 Pavappettaval (1967)
 Kadamattathachan (1966)
 Christmas Rathri (1961) as Dr Philip

Screenplay
 Raathrivandi (1971)
 Ernakulam Junction (1971)
 Preethi (1972)
 Aaraadhika (1973)
 Police Ariyaruthu (1973)
 Arakkallan Mukkaalkkallan (1974)
 Thacholi Marumakan Chanthu (1974)
 Durga (1974)
 Ankathattu (1974)
 Rajaankanam (1976)
 Guruvayoor Kesavan (1977)
 Thacholi Ambu (1978)
 Avar Jeevikkunnu (1978)
 Maamaankam (1979)
 Pichaathikkuttappan (1979)
 Padayottam (1982)

Dialogue
 Othenante Makan (1970)
 Raathrivandi (1971)
 Ernakulam Junction (1971)
 Preethi (1972)
 Aaraadhika (1973)
 Police Ariyaruthu (1973)
 Ponnaapuram Kotta (1973)
 Arakkallan Mukkaalkkallan (1974)
 Thacholi Marumakan Chanthu (1974)
 Durga (1974)
 Ankathattu (1974)
 Rajaankanam (1976)
 Ormakal Marikkumo (1977)
 Guruvayoor Kesavan (1977)
 Thacholi Ambu (1978)
 Avar Jeevikkunnu (1978)
 Maamaankam (1979)
 Pichaathikkuttappan (1979)
 Padayottam (1982)

Story
 Rathrivandi (1971)
 Ernakulam Junction (1971)
 Maravil Thirivu Sookshikkuka (1972)
 Aaraadhika (1973)
 Ponnaapuram Kotta (1973)
 Arakkallan Mukkaalkkallan (1974)
 Thacholi Marumakan Chanthu (1974)
 Durga (1974)
 Panathukkaga (1974)
 Rajaankanam (1976)
 Thacholi Ambu (1978)
 Avar Jeevikkunnu (1978)
 Maamaankam (1979)
 Randu Mukhangal (1981)
 Naagamadathu Thampuraatti (1982)

References

 http://www.nthwall.com/ml/4564100231
 http://imprintsonindianfilmscreen.blogspot.com.au/2012/05/ngovindan-kutty.html

External links

 N Govindankutty at MSI

Indian male film actors
Male actors from Kochi
Malayalam screenwriters
Malayalam-language dramatists and playwrights
Male actors in Malayalam cinema
20th-century Indian male actors
1924 births
1993 deaths
Indian male dramatists and playwrights
Indian male screenwriters
20th-century Indian dramatists and playwrights
Screenwriters from Kochi
20th-century Indian male writers
20th-century Indian screenwriters